Maria Sharapova was the defending champion, and she successfully defended her title, defeating Li Na in the final, 4–6, 6–4, 7–6(7–5). She did so after coming back from a set and a double break deficit in the second set, and saving a match point in the third set, in the final.

Seeds
The top eight seeds receive a bye into the second round.

  Victoria Azarenka (third round, withdrew because of a shoulder injury)
  Maria Sharapova (champion)
  Agnieszka Radwańska (second round)
  Petra Kvitová (quarterfinals)
  Samantha Stosur (third round)
  Caroline Wozniacki (second round, retired)
  Marion Bartoli (second round)
  Li Na (final)
  Serena Williams (semifinal, withdrew due to a lower back injury)
  Francesca Schiavone (first round)
  Sabine Lisicki (first round)
  Angelique Kerber (semifinals)
  Ana Ivanovic (third round)
  Dominika Cibulková (quarterfinals)
  Jelena Janković (first round)
  Maria Kirilenko (first round)

Draw

Finals

Top half

Section 1

Section 2

Bottom half

Section 3

Section 4

Qualifying

Seeds

Qualifiers

Qualifying draw

First qualifier

Second qualifier

Third qualifier

Fourth qualifier

Fifth qualifier

Sixth qualifier

Seventh qualifier

Eighth qualifier

References
Main draw
Qualifying draw

Specific

Italian Open - Singles
Women's Singles